Lonely at the Top may refer to:

 "Lonely at the Top" (song), a 2006 song by The Ordinary Boys
 "Lonely at the Top", a song by Randy Newman, from his album Sail Away
 "Lonely at the Top", a song by Bon Jovi, from their album 100,000,000 Bon Jovi Fans Can't Be Wrong
 "Lonely at the Top", a song by Mick Jagger, from his album She's the Boss
 "Lonely at the Top", a song by Chamillionaire, from his album Mixtape Messiah 7
 Lonely at the Top (album), a 2012 electronic album by Lukid
 Lonely at the Top: The Best of Randy Newman, a 1987 album by Randy Newman
 Lonely at the Top, a 1984 album by Hermine Demoriane